Raja Gaj (king elephant) (c. 1936 – 2007?) was a large Asian elephant that lived in the Bardiya National Park in Nepal. He went missing from his habitat in southwestern Nepal, in December 2007 and was never seen again. He was estimated to be 70 years old at the time of his disappearance.

Raja Gaj was the subject of scientific speculation due to his sheer size and peculiarly domed head which led some to wonder if he might be a genetic throwback to extinct species such as the mammoths and stegodonts. However, a DNA test later confirmed it was a "regular" Asian elephant.
The giant bull was the Bardiya National Park's main attraction.

See also
List of individual elephants

References

External links
Huge Indian Elephant - Rajagaj (Video)
The Giant Elephant Quest
In search of the Beast of Bardia
Mammoth Hunt: In Search of the Giant Elephants of Nepal
Beast of Bardia
The Giant Elephant Quest: In Search of “Lost” Raja Gaj

Individual elephants
Individual animals in Nepal
Individual wild animals
Elephants in Nepal